Marco Bertini (born 7 August 2002) is an Italian professional footballer who plays as a midfielder for Serie A club Lazio.

Professional career
Bertini is a youth product of Lazio, and often captained their youth sides. He made his professional debut with Lazio in a 2–0 Serie A loss to Sassuolo on 23 May 2021.

References

External links
 
 Serie A Profile
 BWin Profile

2002 births
Living people
Footballers from Rome
Italian footballers
Association football midfielders
S.S. Lazio players
Serie A players